Rear Admiral David Arthur Dunbar-Nasmith  (21 February 1921 – 15 September 1997) was a former Royal Navy officer who became Naval Secretary.

Naval career
Born the son of Admiral Martin Dunbar-Nasmith, Dunbar-Nasmith joined the Royal Navy as a Midshipman in 1939. He served in World War II in the Atlantic and the Mediterranean before being given command of HMS Haydon and then HMS Peacock. After the war he commanded HMS Moon and then HMS Rowena before joining the staff of the Flag Officer, 1st Cruiser Squadron and then commanding HMS Enard Bay. He joined the staff of the Supreme Allied Commander Atlantic in 1952 and was then given command of the frigate HMS Alert in 1954. After that he joined the Headquarters of the Supreme Allied Commander Europe in 1958 and then became Commanding Officer of the frigate HMS Berwick as well as Captain of the 5th Frigate Squadron in 1961.

He was appointed Director of Defence Plans at the Ministry of Defence in 1963, Commodore, Amphibious Forces, Far East Fleet from May 1966 to July 1967. Next appointed as Naval Secretary in 1967 and finally Flag Officer, Scotland and Northern Ireland in 1970 before retiring in 1972.

In retirement he became Chairman of the Highlands and Islands Development Board. He was also Gentleman Usher of the Green Rod. He lived at Rothes in Moray.

Family
He married Elizabeth Bowlby in 1951; they had two daughters and two sons. She died in 2021.

References

|-

1921 births
1997 deaths
Royal Navy rear admirals
Companions of the Order of the Bath
Deputy Lieutenants of Moray
Recipients of the Distinguished Service Cross (United Kingdom)
Royal Navy officers of World War II